Musselshell County is a county in south-central Montana. As of the 2020 census, the population was 4,730. Its county seat is Roundup.

History
Musselshell County was created in 1911 by Montana Governor Edwin L. Norris. The area was taken from Fergus, from Yellowstone, and Meagher counties. It was named for the Musselshell River which runs southwest–northeast through the county. That river had been thus named in 1805 by the Lewis and Clark Expedition, due to the abundance of freshwater mussels found along its banks. In 1915, a western portion of the county was partitioned off to form Golden Valley County, giving Musselshell County its present boundaries.

The county's northwestern area is rolling grasslands, which slope southeastward to the Musselshell River and the forested Bull Mountains in the southeast. The county has abundant natural resources of coal deposits, subterranean oil, and timbered slopes.

Geography

Major highways
  U.S. Highway 12
  U.S. Highway 87

Adjacent counties

 Fergus County - northwest
 Petroleum County - north
 Rosebud County - east
 Yellowstone County - south
 Golden Valley County - west

National protected area
 Lake Mason National Wildlife Refuge

Politics
In the fourteen national elections after its organization, Musselshell County voters selected Republican presidential candidates 50% of the time, and Democratic candidates 50% of the time. However, since the 1968 election, the Republican candidate has been selected in every election.

Demographics

2000 census
As of the 2000 United States census there were 4,497 people, 1,878 households, and 1,235 families in the county. The population density was 2 people per square mile (1/km2).  There were 2,317 housing units at an average density of <1/km2 (1/sq mi). The racial makeup of the county was 96.91% White, 0.07% Black or African American, 1.27% Native American, 0.16% Asian, 0.04% Pacific Islander, 0.38% from other races, and 1.18% from two or more races. 1.60% of the population were Hispanic or Latino of any race. 26.6% were of German, 14.8% English, 8.4% Norwegian, 8.1% Irish and 7.4% American ancestry. 96.5% spoke English and 2.6% German as their first language.

There were 1,878 households, out of which 27.20% had children under the age of 18 living with them, 55.60% were married couples living together, 6.60% had a female householder with no husband present, and 34.20% were non-families. 30.10% of all households were made up of individuals, and 13.80% had someone living alone who was 65 years of age or older. The average household size was 2.33, and the average family size was 2.91.

The county population contained 23.40% under the age of 18, 5.70% from 18 to 24, 24.00% from 25 to 44, 29.40% from 45 to 64, and 17.50% who were 65 years of age or older.  The median age was 43 years.  For every 100 females there were 95.40 males.  For every 100 females age 18 and over, there were 95.70 males.

The median income for a household in the county was $25,527, and the median income for a family was $32,298. Males had a median income of $25,000 versus $17,813 for females. The per capita income for the county was $15,389. 19.90% of the population and 13.00% of families were below the poverty line. Out of the total population, 31.70% of those under the age of 18 and 10.50% of those 65 and older were living below the poverty line.

2010 census
As of the 2010 United States census, there were 4,538 people, 2,046 households, and 1,276 families in the county. The racial makeup of the county was 96.1% white, 1.3% American Indian, 0.2% black or African American, 0.2% Asian, 0.2% from other races, and 1.9% from two or more races. Those of Hispanic or Latino origin made up 2.6% of the population. In terms of ancestry, 28.1% were German, 16.5% were English, 16.1% were Irish, 7.6% were Norwegian, and 7.0% were American.

Of the 2,046 households, 23.2% had children under the age of 18 living with them, 52.4% were married couples living together, 6.5% had a female householder with no husband present, 37.6% were non-families, and 33.5% of all households were made up of individuals. The average household size was 2.19 and the average family size was 2.78. The median age was 49.1 years.

The median income for a household in the county was $37,033 and the median income for a family was $47,860. Males had a median income of $33,182 versus $25,750 for females. The per capita income for the county was $20,875. About 14.1% of families and 17.8% of the population were below the poverty line, including 28.6% of those under age 18 and 9.6% of those age 65 or over.

Communities

City
 Roundup (county seat)

Town
 Melstone

Unincorporated communities
 Delphia
 Elso
 Klein
 Queens Point

Census-designated places
 Camp Three
 Flat Willow Colony
 Kilby Butte Colony
 Klein
 Musselshell

See also
 List of lakes in Musselshell County, Montana
 List of mountains in Musselshell County, Montana
 National Register of Historic Places listings in Musselshell County, Montana

References

External links
Musselshell County website

 
1911 establishments in Montana
Populated places established in 1911